W. James Farrell (born April 1942) is an American businessman, known for being the CEO of Illinois Tool Works from 1995 to 2005.

Farrell was in the United States Army from 1965 to 1967 of his military service. He attended the University of Detroit (now University of Detroit Mercy) in 1965, and was an administrator for the Northwestern University located in Evanston, Illinois.

Farrell has served on a variety of corporate boards.  His current boards include: Abbott Laboratories, Allstate, United Airlines and 3M.  Farrell has many civic and philanthropic relationships, including the Economic Club of Chicago, Civic Club of Chicago, past Chairman of the Museum of Science and Industry.  Farrell has also chaired Junior Achievement and United Way of Metropolitan Chicago.

He is retired, and  the Principal of SLP, LLC.

Awards 
W. James Farrell was inducted as a Laureate of the Lincoln Academy of Illinois and awarded the Order of Lincoln (the State's highest honor) by the Governor of Illinois in 2012 in the area of Business & Industry.

References

External links

1942 births
University of Detroit Mercy alumni
Northwestern University staff
Living people
20th-century American businesspeople